Hellmuth Hauser (24 February 1916 – 5 September 2004) was a German general in the Bundeswehr. During World War II, he served in the Luftwaffe and was a recipient of the Knight's Cross of the Iron Cross of Nazi Germany.

Awards and decorations

 Knight's Cross of the Iron Cross on 23 December 1942 as Hauptmann and Staffelkapitän in the I./Kampfgeschwader 51

References

 

1916 births
2004 deaths
Military personnel from Berlin
German World War II pilots
Bundeswehr generals
People from the Province of Brandenburg
Lieutenant generals of the German Air Force
Recipients of the Gold German Cross
Recipients of the Knight's Cross of the Iron Cross